Carney Hospital is a 159-bed community teaching hospital in Dorchester, Massachusetts, affiliated with Tufts University School of Medicine and Tufts Medical Center. The hospital had its beginnings in 1863 in South Boston. It was the first Catholic hospital in New England. Among its first patients were American Civil War soldiers.  In 1892 a Carney Hospital team performed the first abdominal surgery in Boston.

History

Carney Hospital was established in 1863 in South Boston by Andrew Carney with a $75,000 donation and with Sister Ann Alexis Shorb, Carney's choice for its first administrator and a member of the Daughters of Charity of St. Vincent de Paul. It was located on the former Hall Jackson Howe estate on Old Harbor Street on Telegraph Hill. The hospital was designed by Boston City Architect Charles Bateman.

The 40-bed hospital was the first Catholic hospital in New England. In 1877, the first outpatient department in Boston was established by the hospital in two adjacent houses, followed by the first skin clinic in Boston in 1891. The first abdominal surgery in USA was carried out in the hospital by John Homans in 1882. The same year, the first ovariectomy in Boston was carried out in Carney by Henry I. Bowditch. The first Catholic nursing school in New England was opened in 1892.

In 1920 the hospital introduced its Residency training programs.  In 1950 the first plastic hip operation in the United States was performed by Dr. W.R. MacAusland at Carney Hospital. In 1953, the hospital moved from South Boston to its present location in Dorchester. The hospital became one of the first in USA to establish community health centers in 1973. Next year, Carney Hospital provided the first medical emergency rooftop helistop in Massachusetts. The hospital celebrated 125 years of service in 1988. After several months of deliberations, In 1997 the hospital became a member of the non-profit Caritas Christi Health Care group, the second largest health care system in New England, and was christened "Caritas Carney Hospital." Caritas Christi has since been purchased by Cerberus Capital Management and makes up the majority of the Steward Health Care System, the Cerberus affiliate formed by this purchase.

Carney Hospital is mentioned in Philip Roth's alternative history novel The Plot Against America.  While speaking to a crowd "at South Boston's busy Perkins Square," journalist Walter Winchell narrowly survives an assassination attempt and is "driven to Carney Hospital on Telegraph Hill," where he is treated "for facial wounds and minor burns."

References

Further reading 
 Gillespie, C. Bancroft, Illustrated History of South Boston: Issued in Conjunction with and Under Auspices of the South Boston Citizens' Association : Comprising an Historic Record and Pictorial Description of the District, Past and Present, Inquirer Publishing Company, 1900 - South Boston (Boston, Mass.). Cf. p.251

External links
Carney Hospital website

Teaching hospitals in Massachusetts
Catholic hospitals in North America
Hospitals in Boston
Hospitals established in 1863
Tufts University
Hospital buildings completed in 1953
Catholic health care